Završje may refer to:

In Slovenia:
 Završje, Trbovlje

In Croatia:
 Završje, Brod–Posavina County, HR-35252, a village in the Sibinj municipality
 Završje, Istria County, HR-52429, a village in the Grožnjan municipality
 Završje, Požega-Slavonia County, HR-34322, a village in the Brestovac municipality
 Završje Belečko, HR-49254, a village in the Zlatar municipality, Krapina–Zagorje County
 Završje Loborsko, HR-49253, a village in the Lobor municipality, Krapina–Zagorje County
 Završje Netretićko, HR-47271, a village in the Netretić municipality, Karlovac County
 Završje Podbelsko, HR-42242, a village in the Novi Marof municipality, Varaždin County
 Završje Začretsko, HR-49224, a village in the Sveti Križ Začretje municipality, Krapina–Zagorje County

In Bosnia and Herzegovina:
 Završje (Kiseljak)
 Završje (Goražde)
 Završje (region)